Captain (Acting) Francis Newton Allen Cromie, CB, DSO, (30 January 1882 – 31 August 1918, Petrograd) was a distinguished British Royal Navy Commander, and the de facto chief of British Intelligence operations in northern Russia for the British Naval Intelligence Division. At the outbreak of World War I he was commanding officer of the British Royal Navy China Hong Kong submarine flotilla, and from 1915 assumed command of the British submarine flotilla in the Baltic. Later during the First World War and Russian revolution he was naval attaché to the diplomatic staff of the British Embassy in Petrograd (Saint Petersburg), Russia, where he met his death, while defending the British embassy premises.

Early life and naval career
Born in Duncannon, Ireland, he was the son of British army captain Francis Charles Cromie of the Hampshire Regiment (later Consul-General in Dakar, Senegal). His mother was the daughter of the Chief Constable of Pembrokeshire. He was educated at Haverfordwest Grammar School in Wales, and in 1897 joined the Royal Navy as a naval cadet at HMS Britannia; he joined HMS Repulse on passing out, and in 1900, as a midshipman of HMS Barfleur, took part in the Seymour Expedition to China, for which he received the China War Medal with Peking clasp.

Submarine Service
In 1901, he was promoted to lieutenant rank, two years later he obtained four "first lieutenant" appointments. That same year in 1903, he volunteered to join the Royal Navy Submarine Service, and was one of the first officers to command a submarine. In 1906 he was awarded the bronze Royal Humane Society medal, while serving on submarine HMS A3 at Spithead, he tried to save a sailor who was swept overboard. From 1911 to 1912 he commanded the depot ship HMS Onyx and a flotilla of submarines at Devonport, and in 1913-14 the depot ship HMS Rosario and the British China Hong Kong submarine flotilla.

In August 1915 he commissioned the submarine HMS E19, the following month he forced a passage into the Baltic Sea to support the Russian Baltic Fleet, preying on iron ore transports from Sweden to the German Empire, where for a week long moment he had succeeded in entirely suspending German maritime traffic in the area. During his service in the Baltic, he torpedoed a German destroyer and on 7 November 1915 sank the German cruiser Undine, as well as sinking or capturing 10 German steamships.

Service distinction
On 31 May 1916 he received the British Empire Distinguished Service Order (DSO), followed by a succession of imperial Russian orders; Order of St. Anna (2nd Class with Swords), Order of St. Vladimir (4th Class with Swords), Order of St. George (4th Class), as well as the French National Order of the Legion of Honour (Chevalier). Shortly after, he was promoted to the British Royal Navy rank of Commander.

Diplomatic service in revolutionary Petrograd

Together with his knowledge of the Russian language and prevailing conditions, he was appointed in May 1917 naval attaché to the British Embassy in the tense revolutionary city of Petrograd (Saint Petersburg), Russia. Highly respected among Russia's elite, his diplomatic tact, during the Russian revolution, earned him much respect from the extremists for his fairness. In April 1918, after the Germans had secured control over the Baltic coast, he was responsible for the evacuation and scuttling of the British Baltic submarines.

Death defending the British embassy in Petrograd
Prior to the embassy incident that involved his killing, Moscow authorities claimed to have received a report suggesting a connection between various counter-revolutionary organizations in the British government and the embassy in Petrograd, and the Bolshevik-government commissioner M. Hillier had been instructed to investigate this report. It had been supposed that the anti-Bolshevik counter-revolutionists Boris Savinkov and Maximilian Filonenko, who had contacts with British Secret Intelligence Service agents, were being aided and hiding in the British embassy. Other accounts and sources, however, reveal that meetings with other Russian members of the counter-revolution were at that time taking place, namely with the former imperial Tsarist officers Lieutenant Sabir and Colonel Steckelmann.

On 31 August 1918, commissioner Hillier and a detachment of Cheka "scouts", the Bolsheviks secret police, went to the British embassy in Petrograd. On entering the building, shouting in Russian and crashing doors, which echoed up from the embassy ground floor where staff were working, Captain Cromie glanced out from his office first floor window, saw trucks and over on the Neva river patrol boats facing the embassy building with weapons trained. Clearly expecting trouble, he pulled out his revolver, and leaving a meeting with three operatives in his office, had gone out into the first floor hallway passage. Other accounts and sources, however, reveal Captain Cromie was having tea with the British Chaplain, Mr. Lombard, and he had stepped out of the room to return in a short moment. Some Cheka scouts were now also proceeding up onto the embassy first floor, panic and protests broke out, and they were met with gunfire, one Cheka scout was killed and another wounded. According to the Cheka scouts report of events and a dispatch received from Moscow quoting Russia's political newspaper Pravda; a fight had ensued in the corridor and the Cheka scouts were obliged to return gunfire. During the ferocious embassy shootout, naval attaché Captain Cromie, received a fatal gunshot or gunshots, and eventually died where he fell, on the grand embassy staircase. Cheka scouts continued searching the embassy building, and with their rifle butts repelled embassy staff from getting close to the corpse of Captain Cromie, which the Cheka's had looted and trampled. The police then entered the British embassy, and 40 embassy persons were arrested, mostly British subjects, including Prince Schaschowsky. It was alleged that weapons and compromising documents were found on the embassy premises.

British Foreign Office advices declared; attaché Captain Cromie opposed the Bolshevik troops and killed three soldiers with his own hands. Captain Cromie was killed and his corpse mutilated. Documents at the embassy were destroyed. It was feared similar outrages would be committed against the French embassy in Petrograd and that precautionary measures had been taken including the arrival of French soldiers, the Foreign Office said.

On 3 September 1918, American Consul Haynes (the first American Consul of career) at Helsinki in Finland, officially reported the murder of Captain Cromie and attack on the British embassy to the United States Department of State, that the entire British embassy personnel in Petrograd had been arrested, and similar arrests had simultaneously taken place in Moscow.

British outrage at embassy attack and killing
The embassy attack and killing of naval attaché Captain Cromie was reported with intense indignation by the British news media. The British media channeled outrage at the Bolsheviks "lawlessness" acts committed against British subjects and the murder of Captain Cromie, prompting reprisals. In London, the Bolshevik representatives Maxim Litvinov and his staff had been placed by the British government "under preventive arrest" and taken to Brixton Prison "until all British representatives in Bolshevik Russia had been set at liberty and allowed to proceed to the Finnish border unmolested." Following events, the British embassy was subsequently shutdown, and the embassy staff were withdrawn from service in Petrograd.

Witness recollection of events
A firsthand recount, published in 1934 by Mary Britnieva, a Red Cross nurse who had served on the Eastern Front, recounts the events witnessed by her sister-in-law, who was in the British embassy at the time of the attack:

"My sister in law ran out into the hallway and as she emerged she saw Captain Cromie running down the steps two at a time, straight towards her. Behind him at the top of the stairs, stood a man firing at the Captain. Several bullets whizzed by her head and crashed through the glass of the entrance doors behind her. Her horror seemed to root her to the spot and suddenly, just as Captain Cromie reached the last stair, he pitched forward as if he had stumbled, staggered a little and then crashed down backwards with his head on the bottom step. My sister in law ran to him and lifted his head. He was moving his eyelids and she felt something warm trickling down the fingers of her right hand with which she was holding up his head from underneath. Suddenly a terrific blow made her drop Captain Cromie's head and sent her spinning against the right hand wall. The man who had struck her grabbed her and ran her up the stairs hitting her violently from time to time and finally pushing her into the Chancery room where she found all of the members of the Embassy and the Consulate standing with hands raised above their heads. After being searched for arms, the Embassy staff were forced to hand over their papers and then marched downstairs and on to the street."

Marriage
Francis Cromie married Gladys (Gwladys) Catherine Josephine (née Cromie) March 1907, in Portsmouth, Hampshire, England. They had one daughter, Dolores Anthea, born June 1907, in Fareham, Hampshire, England. His widow, Gladys (Gwladys) Catherine Josephine, remarried in June 1920.

Posthumous Service Award
Captain Francis Cromie was posthumously awarded the Distinguished Service Order (DSO) and the Companion of the Order of the Bath (CB) "in recognition of his distinguished service in the Allied cause in Russia, and of the devotion to duty which he displayed in remaining at his post as British Naval Attaché in Russia, when the British Embassy was withdrawn. This devotion to duty cost him his life." King George V received Capt. Cromie's widow Gladys (Gwladys) Catherine Cromie at Buckingham Palace, and handed to her the DSO and the CB.

He remains the only naval attaché to be killed in combat.

Burial
Captain Cromie's body was first taken to the Bolshevik Smolny Institute, and later released to the British Chaplaincy. Covered with the Union flag, his body was finally buried in Smolensky Cemetery, Saint Petersburg, by the Scottish minister Dr. Kean. A memorial in Captain Cromie's memory was laid at the Commonwealth War Graves Commission Archangel Memorial (Archangel Allied Cemetery), in Arkhangelsk, Russia.

Dramatic representations
Captain Cromie was portrayed by actor Barry Stokes in 2 episodes of popular 1983 drama Reilly, Ace of Spies where he is depicted as aiding British agents Sidney Reilly and George Alexander Hill, culminating in his defence of the embassy.

Literature

References

External links
Diving in the Baltic Sea, The E19 massacre - Ocean Discovery 
Spartacus Educational: British History > Spies and Spymasters > Francis Cromie

Royal Navy submarine commanders
1882 births
1918 deaths
Deaths by firearm in Russia
British people murdered abroad
People murdered in the Soviet Union
Recipients of the Order of St. Anna, 2nd class
Recipients of the Order of St. Vladimir, 4th class
Royal Navy officers of World War I
British military personnel killed in World War I
British naval attachés